Nurullah Candan (born 30 December 1948) is a Turkish athlete. He competed in the men's high jump at the 1968 Summer Olympics.

References

1948 births
Living people
Athletes (track and field) at the 1968 Summer Olympics
Turkish male high jumpers
Turkish male hurdlers
Turkish decathletes
Olympic athletes of Turkey
Sportspeople from Ankara
Mediterranean Games bronze medalists for Turkey
Mediterranean Games medalists in athletics
Athletes (track and field) at the 1975 Mediterranean Games
20th-century Turkish people